Lukáš Fujerik (born 9 December 1983) is a Czech football player who currently plays for Slovácko.

References

External links
 

1983 births
Living people
Czech footballers
Czech First League players
FC Fastav Zlín players
MFK Vítkovice players
FK Jablonec players
1. FC Slovácko players
Association football midfielders